Silvia Saint, born Silvie Tomčalová (born 12 February 1976) is a former Czech pornographic actress. In 1996 she was Penthouse Pet of the Year in the Czech edition of the magazine. She has appeared in over 300 pornographic movies.

Early life
Silvia Saint was born Silvia Tomcalova on February 12, 1976, in what is now the Czech Republic. She was an only child who faced many hardships in her life including poverty and the death of her father when she was young.

Career
Saint began as an erotic modeling, first lingerie, then nude in magazines and finally to pornographic films. She was Penthouse Pet of the Year in 1996 (Czech edition). After her introduction to the American porn industry she became the October 1998 Penthouse Pet of the Month (U.S. edition).

Saint's early films were shot in Europe, many for Private Media Group. She performed in a Private Media Group sex in space-themed pornographic film The Uranus Experiment: Part Two, which featured a brief scene filmed in a Russian aircraft flying a parabolic track (similar to NASA's Vomit Comet). The film featured around 20 seconds of Saint and Nick Lang (who both portray astronauts living on a space station) having penetrative sex in freefall. The scene was nominated for a Nebula Award, but it did not win.

Saint was awarded a Lifetime Achievement Award at Torino Sex 2005, Turin's second annual Delta of Venus Fair.

In 2006 she won the rights to the Internet domain name silviasaint.com from a cybersquatter in a Uniform Domain-Name Dispute-Resolution Policy action. In 2007, the mobile game Sylvia Saint in Erotic Pool was released for Java ME-supported phones. Since 2007 she has only starred and performed in lesbian sex movies, while also taking care of the auditions as director and producer to her official website.

Awards
 1998 AVN Award – Best Tease Performance (Fresh Meat 4)
 2000 Hot d'Or Award – Best European Supporting Actress (Le Contrat des Anges)
 2000 FICEB Ninfa Award – Best Lesbian Scene (Alexia and Cie) with Nikki Anderson & Kate More
 2004 FICEB Ninfa Award – Best Actress (Public)
 2005 FICEB Ninfa Award – Best Actress (Public)
 2012 AVN Hall of Fame inductee

References

External links

 
 
 
 

1976 births
Living people
People from Kyjov
Czech pornographic film actresses
Czech female adult models
Penthouse Pets